The Zane Grey Estate  is a historic house in Altadena, California.  It was listed on the National Register of Historic Places in 2002.

The main house was built by Chicago business machine manufacturer Arthur Herbert Woodward. Designed by architects Myron Hunt and Elmer Grey, the 1907 Mediterranean Revival style house is acclaimed as the first fireproof home in Altadena, built entirely of reinforced concrete as prescribed by Woodward's wife, Edith Norton Woodward. Edith Woodward was a survivor of the Iroquois Theater Fire of 1903.

In 1920, spurred by the memory of a visit to Altadena during their honeymoon, Zane Grey and his wife bought the home. After the Greys bought it they built an addition on the roof for a studio and library.  After the Greys' death, their sons owned the property. The actual grounds were divided up and neighboring house were built on them. The house was sold by their son, Romer, in 1970.

References

Houses in Altadena, California
Grey
Grey
Grey
Elmer Grey buildings
Buildings and structures on the National Register of Historic Places in Los Angeles County, California